William Earl Millikin (September 30, 1890–March 23, 1970) was the Mayor of Seattle, Washington from 1941 to 1942.

Millikin was born on September 30, 1890, in Oswego, Kansas. He attended several schools including Baker University in Baldwin City, Kansas; the University of Oregon; the University of Washington; and the University of California.

Before the 1919–1920 school year, Millikin resigned his teaching position at Lincoln High School in Portland, Oregon. He arrived at Queen Anne High School in Seattle in 1919 as a history teacher and athletic coach. He resigned from the high school eleven years later, working for a book publisher and the Department of Labor and Industries.

In 1937, when Millikin was King County, Washington auditor, he issued "hundreds of [marriage] licences [...] without the prospective bride and groom being compelled to appear" according to the Associated Press, who cited "white slavery" as the main opposition to Millikin's practices. He served two full terms as auditor.

Millikin was elected as Mayor of Seattle on March 11, 1941, defeating police chief William F. Devin in a special election to finish the term of mayor Arthur B. Langlie, who resigned to become Governor of Washington. During a strike of American Federation of Labor affiliated welders in October 1941, Seattle Mayor Millikin demanded the striking workers return to their jobs without negotiations.

Millikin was mayor at the time of the Bombing of Pearl Harbor and the United States's entry into World War II. He supported the internment of Japanese Americans, which began in early 1942, and stirred fears of Japanese traitors that would burn Seattle to the ground. On March 8, 1942, Millikin was at the launching of the USS Carmick (DD-493) when he said it would be "heard in Australia and Tokyo" in front of ten thousand shipyard workers and United States Navy men.

Millikin lost to Devin in the 1942 mayoral election. After leaving office, he was called into the United States Army and served with Artillery units in the South Pacific. He retired as a lieutenant colonel in 1945. Millikin would go on to work for the State Department of Veteran Affairs and as a distillery representative before serving on the civil staff of King County Sheriff Tim McCullough until his permanent retirement in 1960.

He died on March 23, 1970, at the age of 79, in Seattle.

References

Washington (state) Republicans
Mayors of Seattle
Kansas Republicans
People from Oswego, Kansas
Baker University alumni
University of Oregon alumni
University of Washington alumni
University of California alumni
1890 births
1970 deaths